James Gilbrugh Bull (1838 – November 2, 1927) was the 24th mayor and 22nd mayor of Columbus, Ohio.  He was also the 20th person to serve in that office.   He served Columbus for eight years during four non-consecutive terms.  His successor after 1870 was George W. Meeker and after 1874 was John H. Heitmann.    He died November 2, 1927.

References

Bibliography

Further reading

External links
James Gilbrugh Bull at Political Graveyard

Mayors of Columbus, Ohio
1838 births
1927 deaths
Ohio Democrats